The Secondary Schools Examinations Council (SSEC) was established in England and Wales in 1917. It was succeeded by the Schools Council in 1963. It existed to provide external examinations for secondary schools as recommended by a Consultative Committee reporting to the Board of Education in 1917, these being the School Certificate and Higher School Certificate. The SSEC had "the duty of co-ordinating examinations and of negotiating with professional bodies for the acceptance of Certificates", with Universities acting as responsible bodies for conducting any of the examinations.

References

Education in England
Education in Wales
Secondary education in England
Secondary education in Wales
1917 establishments in England